Jasmeet Kaur Bains (born 1986) is an American physician and politician serving as a member of the California State Assembly for the 35th district. She assumed office on December 5, 2022.

Early life and education 
Bains was born in Delano, California. She earned a Bachelor of Science degree in biology from the Illinois Institute of Technology in 2006 and a Doctor of Medicine from the American University of Antigua in 2013.

Career 
From 2015 to 2018, Bains was a resident physician at Clinica Sierra Vista in Bakersfield, California. She worked as a family medicine physician at Omni Family Health from 2018 to 2020. In 2017, Bains was appointed to the California Healthcare Workforce Policy Commission by California Governor Jerry Brown. She also served as a member of the California Developmental Services Taskforce and as a volunteer physician for the California Emergency Medical Services Authority. Bains was elected to the California State Assembly in November 2022, defeating Kern County Supervisor Leticia Perez in an upset.

References 

1986 births
Living people
California Democrats
Physicians from California
Family physicians
Members of the California State Assembly
Women state legislators in California
People from Delano, California

American politicians of Indian descent
American Sikhs
People from Bakersfield, California
Illinois Institute of Technology alumni